The diving competitions at the 2017 Southeast Asian Games in Kuala Lumpur took place at National Aquatic Centre  in Bukit Jalil. It was one of four aquatic sports at the Games, along with swimming, water polo, and synchronised swimming.

The 2017 Games featured competitions in thirteen events (men 5 events, women 5 events and mixed 3 events).

Events
The following events were contested:

1 m springboard
3 m springboard
10 m platform
3 m springboard synchronised
10 m platform synchronised
3 m mixed springboard synchronised
10 m mixed platform synchronised
Team event

Competition schedule
All times are Malaysia Standard Time (UTC+8)

Participation

Participating nations

Medal summary

Medal table

Men

Women

Mixed

Notes

References

External links